Seoul Baekje Museum is a museum in South Korea. Based on the natural silhouette of the nearby Mongchontoseong, the appearance of Seoul Baekje Museum was shaped a ship of Baekje in honor of Baekje. Seoul Baekje Museum is a civic lifelong education center with an emphasis on the educational role. There are a variety of Baekje artifacts and vividly embodied materials on ancient history of the Korean peninsula.

References

External links

2012 establishments in South Korea
Government of Seoul
Museums in Seoul
Baekje
Olympic Park, Seoul